Nantucket is an upper middle income residential neighborhood in the Woodlawn area in the community of Dartmouth within the Halifax Regional Municipality Nova Scotia. The area was built in early 1970s across Portland Street (Route 207) from Portland Estates. It was named after the Nantucket Whaling Company which was once situated on Halifax Harbour.

Communities in Halifax, Nova Scotia
Dartmouth, Nova Scotia